The Second Ministry of Machine Building (第二机械工业部) was a government ministry of the People's Republic of China which oversaw the nuclear industry. It was established in August 1952. In April 1988 it became part of the newly created Ministry of Energy Resources.

See also
First Ministry of Machine-Building of the PRC
Third Ministry of Machine-Building of the PRC, ministry of aviation industry
Fourth Ministry of Machine-Building of the PRC, ministry of electronics industry
Fifth Ministry of Machine-Building of the PRC, ministry of tank equipment and artillery
Sixth Ministry of Machine-Building of the PRC, ministry of shipbuilding
Seventh Ministry of Machine-Building of the PRC, ministry of space industry
Eighth Ministry of Machine-Building of the PRC

Bibliography
 Malcolm Lamb: Directory of officials and Organizations in China, ME Sharpe Inc. Armonk, NY, 2003, p. 1911 +, Volume 1
 China's Economic System, Routledge Abingdon 2005, 594 p., 

Government ministries of the People's Republic of China